Gasteropelecus maculatus is a freshwater pelagic fish found in Central and South America from eastern Panama through western Colombia. It growth up to 6.4 cm and feeds on small crustaceans, larvae and mosquitoes.

References

Gasteropelecidae
Fish of Panama
Freshwater fish of Colombia
Magdalena River
Taxa named by Franz Steindachner
Fish described in 1879